Switzerland competed at the 1952 Summer Olympics in Helsinki, Finland. 157 competitors, 148 men and 9 women, took part in 96 events in 17 sports.

Gold 
Jack Günthard — Gymnastics, Men's Horizontal Bar
Hans Eugster — Gymnastics, Men's Parallel Bars

Silver 
 Fritz Schwab — Athletics, Men's 10 km Walk 
 Henri Chammartin, Gustav Fischer, and Gottfried Trachsel — Equestrian,  Dressage Team Competition
Josef Stalder — Gymnastics, Men's Horizontal Bar
Hans Eugster, Ernst Fivian, Ernst Gebendinger, Jack Günthard, Hans Schwarzentruber, Josef Stalder, Melchior Thalmann, and Jean Tschabold — Gymnastics, Men's Combined Exercises
Enrico Bianchi, Émile Ess, Walter Leiser, Heini Scheller, and Karl Weidmann — Rowing, Men's Coxed Fours
Robert Bürchler — Shooting, Men's Free Rifle, Three Positions

Bronze 
 Oswald Zappelli — Fencing, Men's Épée Individual Competition
 Paul Barth, Willy Fitting, Paul Meister, Otto Rüfenacht, Mario Valota, and Oswald Zappelli — Fencing, Men's Épée Team Competition
Josef Stalder — Gymnastics, Men's All-Around Individual 
Josef Stalder — Gymnastics, Men's Parallel Bars
Hans Eugster — Gymnastics, Men's Rings
Hans Kalt and Kurt Schmid — Rowing, Men's Coxless Pairs

Athletics

Basketball

Men's Team Competition
Qualification Round (Group A)
 Lost to Bulgaria (58-69)
 Lost to Belgium (49-59) → did not advance

Boxing

Canoeing

Cycling

Road Competition
Men's Individual Road Race (190.4 km)
Rolf Graf — 5:12:45.3 (→ 17th place)
Fausto Lurati — 5:24:58.0 (→ 50th place)
Kobi Scherer — did not finish (→ no ranking)

Track Competition
Men's 1.000m Time Trial
Fredy Arber
 Final — 1:15.4 (→ 15th place)

Men's 1.000m Sprint Scratch Race
Fritz Siegenthaler — 16th place

Men's 4.000m Team Pursuit
Hans Pfenninger, Heinrich Müller, Max Wirth, and Oskar von Büren  
 Eliminated in quarterfinals (→ 8th place)

Diving

Men's 3m Springboard
Heinz Schaub
 Preliminary Round — 47.15 points (→ 35th place)

Women's 10m Platform
Ferdinanda Martini-Pautasso
 Preliminary Round — 30.04 points (→ 15th place)

Equestrian

Fencing

Ten fencers, nine men and one woman, represented Switzerland in 1952.

Men's épée
 Oswald Zappelli
 Paul Barth
 Paul Meister

Men's team épée
 Otto Rüfenacht, Paul Meister, Oswald Zappelli, Paul Barth, Willy Fitting, Mario Valota

Men's sabre
 Otto Greter
 Jules Amez-Droz
 Umberto Menegalli

Men's team sabre
 Umberto Menegalli, Oswald Zappelli, Otto Greter, Jules Amez-Droz

Women's foil
 Hedwig Rieder

Gymnastics

Hockey

Modern pentathlon

Three male pentathletes represented Switzerland in 1952.

Individual
 Werner Vetterli
 Werner Schmid
 Erhard Minder

Team
 Werner Vetterli
 Werner Schmid
 Erhard Minder

Rowing

Switzerland had 13 male rowers participate in five out of seven rowing events in 1952.

 Men's single sculls
 Paul Meyer

 Men's double sculls
 Peter Stebler
 Émile Knecht

 Men's coxless pair
 Kurt Schmid
 Hans Kalt

 Men's coxed pair
 Walter Lüchinger
 Alex Siebenhaar
 Walter Ludin (cox)

 Men's coxed four
 Rico Bianchi
 Karl Weidmann
 Heini Scheller
 Émile Ess
 Walter Leiser (cox)

Sailing

Shooting

Nine shooters represented Switzerland in 1952.

25 m pistol
 Rudolf Schnyder

50 m pistol
 Beat Rhyner
 Alexander Specker

300 m rifle, three positions
 Robert Bürchler
 August Hollenstein

50 m rifle, three positions
 Ernst Huber
 Otto Horber

50 m rifle, prone
 Otto Horber
 Ernst Huber

Trap
 Louis Cavalli
 Pierre-André Flückiger

Swimming

Weightlifting

Wrestling

References

Nations at the 1952 Summer Olympics
1952
1952 in Swiss sport